Edward White (January 15, 1877 – December 3, 1908) was a private in the United States Army and a Medal of Honor recipient for his role in the Philippine–American War.

Following his military service, White became a firefighter in Kansas City, but was forced to retire in 1905 due to ill health. He died from tuberculosis a few years later, and was buried in Mount Calvary Cemetery, Kansas City, Kansas.

Medal of Honor citation
Rank and organization: Private, Company B, 20th Kansas Volunteer Infantry. Place and date: At Calumpit, Luzon, Philippine Islands, 27 April 1899. Entered service at: Kansas City, Kans. Birth: Seneca, Kans. Date of issue: 11 March 1902.

Citation:

Swam the Rio Grande de Pampanga in face of the enemy's fire and fastened a rope to occupied trenches, thereby enabling the crossing of the river and the driving of the enemy from his fortified position.

See also

 List of Medal of Honor recipients
 List of Philippine–American War Medal of Honor recipients

References

External links
 
 Kansas National Guard Bio

1877 births
1908 deaths
United States Army Medal of Honor recipients
United States Army soldiers
People from Seneca, Kansas
American military personnel of the Philippine–American War
Philippine–American War recipients of the Medal of Honor